Vigantice is a municipality and village in Vsetín District in the Zlín Region of the Czech Republic. It has about 1,100 inhabitants.

Notable people
Radim Kučera (born 1974), footballer and football manager
Milan Baroš (born 1981), footballer

Twin towns – sister cities

Vigantice is twinned with:
 Ludrová, Slovakia

References

External links

Villages in Vsetín District